Devikapuram, also called Devigai, is a town and a Panchayat board in Tiruvannamalai district, located in Tamil Nadu, India. The town is famous for handlooms, Silk weaving and ricemills, which process Arni Ponni rice. Located on the Polur - Sadras state highway, 45 kilometres from the city of Tiruvannamalai, also the district headquarters.

Location 
Devikapuram is part of Tiruvannamalai district, Arni taluk, located in Polur-to-Chetput Road (SH-115). It is part of Thondai mandalam. It is a quiet & calm village without any industry. People lead a pleasant life by doing agriculture and weaving.

Devikapuram, the village is about 158 km(98 mi) South-West of Chennai. Also about 42 km West of Vandavasi (Wandiwash); 15 km East of Polur; 21 km South of Arani; 51 km North-East of Tiruvannamalai and 60 km South-East of Vellore. While going from Vandavasi, after Nedungunam comes Chetpet and in the same road towards Polur (West) comes Devikapuram. The Periyanaki amman temple located at north side of main road.

Demography 
Devikapuram is a census town and most of the people are involved in textile business and Rice mills like its big neighbour Arni. Agamudaya Mudaliar, Sengundha Mudaliar, Tamil Jains are the prominent communities of the town.

Government and Politics

Amenities
Nathan cable vision, Bsnl, Railwire,Tic fibre are the Internet Service Providers. KBC Wired And Wireless Broadband Communications (BSNL) are also available.

Economy 
 Agriculture (Rice & Sugarcane)
 Milk
 Handloom & Power loom Silk saree production (extensively done by half of the population)
Cattle rearing

Several commercial banks and ATMs are available.

Landmarks 
 Periyanayagi Amman Temple
 Ponmalai Nathar Temple, aka Kanagagireeswar (on hill)

Transport

By Road
Devikapuram is located on State Highway 115. 

This village has connecting bus from:
 Chennai (150 km)
 Thiruvannamalai (50 km)
 Arni (21 km)
 Polur (14 km) and
 Vellore (60 km)
Chetpet (14 km)

From Vandavasi:
Chennai to Vandavasi (via Uthiramerur/Thennangur) – 128 approx km
Vandavasi to Chetput – 27 km
Chetput to Devikapuram – 12 km

From Arani:
Arani  – 21 km

From Polur:
Polur to Devikapuram – 15 km

Buses are plying to Devikapuram from Chennai ( CMBT )round the clock with Bus No.148( Direct Bus) and Bus No. 131(Via Kanchipuram).
Town and mofussil buses from Arni, Chetpet and Polur are available.

Rail

 Polur is the nearby Railway station. Services have been resumed after the conversion of track.  Trains arrives/depart to/from Katpadi, Vellore, Thiruvannamalai, Villupuram, Madurai, Nagarkoil and Mumbai, there daily two trains to tirupati  .
 Train details

Air
 Chennai (Domestic & International) (150 km)
 Bangalore (Domestic & International) (350 km)

Education
 Government boys school (Higher secondary)
 Government girls school (High school)
 Government elementary school
 Cluny Matriculation school (Private)
 RCM School (Elementary level)
 Annamalaiar College of engineering

Hospitals 
 Primary Health Center
 Few private clinics

References 
 https://web.archive.org/web/20111204022242/http://www.devikapuram.in/
 http://www.templenet.com/Tamilnadu/devikapuram.html
 https://web.archive.org/web/20090517113402/http://www.omarunachala.com/devikapuram.asp
 http://devikapuram.wordpress.com/

Villages in Tiruvannamalai district
Cities and towns in Tiruvannamalai district